Galeatus is a genus of lace bugs in the family Tingidae. There are about 18 described species in Galeatus.

Species
These 18 species belong to the genus Galeatus:

 Galeatus affinis (Herrich-schaeffer, 1835)
 Galeatus armatus Takeya, 1931
 Galeatus cellularis Jakovlev, 1884
 Galeatus clara Drake, 1948
 Galeatus decorus Jakovlev, 1880
 Galeatus helianthi Önder, 1978
 Galeatus inermis (Jakovlev, 1876)
 Galeatus maculatus (Herrich-Schaeffer, 1838)
 Galeatus major Puton, 1886
 Galeatus pardus Golub, 1974
 Galeatus regius Golub, 1974
 Galeatus schwarzi Drake
 Galeatus scitulus Drake & Maa, 1953
 Galeatus scrophicus Saunders, 1876
 Galeatus sinuatus (Herrich-Schaeffer, 1838)
 Galeatus spinifrons (Fallén, 1807)
 Galeatus trevius Li & Zheng, 2006
 Galeatus vitreus Golub, 1974

References

Further reading

External links

 

Tingidae
Articles created by Qbugbot